Dagny Knutson (born January 18, 1992) is an American swimmer of Norwegian heritage. Knutson is a former American record holder in 400-yard individual medley and holds several high school national records.  She finished swimming competitively in 2012 and in 2013, due to her struggles with bulimia and financial strains.

Swimming career
At the 2008 FINA Youth World Swimming Championships, Knutson won a total of five medals, all of them gold.  At the 2008 Short Course Nationals, Knutson broke Katie Hoff's American record in the 400-yard individual medley with a time of 4:00.62, a record which has since been broken by Julia Smit.  At the 2009 Junior Pac Pacs, she set five meet records while winning seven gold medals and a bronze.

At the 2009 National Championships, Knutson qualified to swim in the 4x200 m freestyle relay at the 2009 World Aquatics Championships in Rome by placing fifth in the 200 m freestyle. In Rome, Knutson swam in the heats of the 4x200 m freestyle relay (with Ariana Kukors, Alyssa Anderson, and Lacey Nymeyer) and won a silver medal after the United States placed second in the finals.  As the second leg, Knutson had a 1:57.73 split.

At the 2010 National Championships, Knutson did not qualify to swim in any individual events at the 2010 Pan Pacific Swimming Championships.  Knutson placed 4th in the 400 m freestyle, 5th in the 200 m freestyle, 6th in the 400 m individual medley, and 19th in the 200 m butterfly.

At the 2011 World Aquatics Championships in Shanghai, Knutson won a gold medal in the 4×200-meter freestyle relay with Missy Franklin, Katie Hoff, and Allison Schmitt, with the team finishing ahead of Australia and China.  As the second leg, Knutson had a 1:57.18 split.

Personal life
Knutson started swimming at the age of 9.  Her parents, Jim and Ronda, were both college athletes. Her parents have chosen for her a Norwegian name. Her father was a US Citizen and his parents had moved to America from Norway, and her name honors that lineage.

Knutson's hometown is Minot, North Dakota, but she has trained at the University of Florida after briefly training with Auburn University then FAST in Fullerton, California. Because of geographic proximity, Knutson used to swim in so many meets in Canada that she was once mistakenly named one of that country's top 12-year-old swimmers.

Personal bests

All times were set in a 50 metres pool.

See also
 List of World Aquatics Championships medalists in swimming (women)

References

External links
 
 

1992 births
Living people
American female freestyle swimmers
American people of Norwegian descent
Sportspeople from Fayetteville, North Carolina
Sportspeople from Minot, North Dakota
World Aquatics Championships medalists in swimming
21st-century American women